Drew Major (born June 17, 1956) is a computer scientist and entrepreneur.  He is best known for his role as one of the principal engineers of the Novell NetWare operating system from early in Novell's history. He currently resides in Orem, Utah with his wife, Mary, and their four sons.

Major received a Bachelor of Science degree from Brigham Young University in 1980, and graduated with honors in mathematics and computer science. He was born in California but has lived most of his life in Utah.

SuperSet Software
SuperSet Software was a group founded by friends and former Eyring Research Institute (ERI) co-workers Drew Major, Dale Neibaur, Kyle Powell, and later joined by Mark Hurst. Their work was based on classwork that they started in October 1981 at Brigham Young University, Provo, Utah, USA, and upon previous work experiences at Eyring Research Institute working with the Xerox Network Systems (XNS) protocol which led to the development of  the Novell IPX and SPX networking protocols, and the NetWare operating system.

In 1983, Ray Noorda took over leadership of Novell and engaged the SuperSet group to work on networking products. The team was originally assigned to create a CP/M disk sharing system to help network the CP/M hardware that Novell was selling at the time. Under Ray Noorda's leadership, the group developed a successful file sharing system for the newly introduced IBM-compatible PC.

The group also wrote a text-mode game called Snipes and used it to test the new network and demonstrate its capabilities.

Novell 
Major joined Novell in 1983, and his partners Kyle Powell, Dale Neibaur, and Mark Hurst began to work in enabling PCs to share files and other resources via a local area network (LAN).  Major was the lead architect and developer of the NetWare operating system for over 15 years. Major left Novell in 2003.

Move Networks 
After leaving Novell, Major co-founded video networking company Move Networks, Inc. The company began to experience financial problems in 2010 for failing to deliver on key technologies, which resulted in some of its larger customers abandoning the company's technology.  The company was subsequently acquired for 45 million dollars by EchoStar, Inc. in January 2011.

External links

References

1956 births
Living people
American Latter Day Saints
Brigham Young University alumni
Novell people